Florin Mergea and Lukáš Rosol were the defending champions, but chose not to participate together. Mergea played alongside Marin Draganja, but lost in the semifinals to Andre Begemann and Julian Knowle. Rosol teamed up with Santiago González, but lost in the semifinals to Jürgen Melzer and Philipp Petzschner.

Melzer and Petzschner went on to win the title, defeating Begemann and Knowle in the final, 7–6(8–6), 4–6, [10–7].

Seeds

Draw

Draw

External links
 Main draw

Erste Bank Open - Doubles
2014 Doubles
Erste Bank Open Doubles